Psalm 110 is the 110th psalm of the Book of Psalms, beginning in English in the King James Version: "The  said unto my Lord". In Latin, it is known as Dixit Dominus ("The Lord Said"). It is considered both a royal psalm and a messianic psalm.  C. S. Rodd associates it with the king's coronation. In the slightly different numbering system used in the Greek Septuagint and Latin Vulgate translations of the Bible, this psalm is Psalm 109.

This psalm is a cornerstone in Christian theology, as it is cited as proof of the plurality of the Godhead and Jesus' supremacy as king, priest, and Messiah. For this reason, Psalm 110 is "the most frequently quoted or referenced psalm in the New Testament". Classical Jewish sources, in contrast, state that the subject of the psalm is either Abraham, David, or the Jewish Messiah.

The psalm forms a regular part of Jewish, Catholic, Lutheran, Anglican and other Protestant liturgies. Because this psalm is prominent in the Office of Vespers, its Latin text has particular significance in music. Well-known vespers settings are Monteverdi's Vespro della Beata Vergine (1610), and Mozart's Vesperae solennes de confessore (1780). Handel composed his Dixit Dominus in 1707, and Vivaldi set the psalm in Latin three times.

Background
The psalm is usually dated in its first part in the pre-exilic period of Israel, sometimes even completely in the oldest monarchy.

Text

Hebrew Bible version
Following is the Hebrew text of Psalm 110:

King James Version
 The  said unto my lord, Sit thou at my right hand, until I make thine enemies thy footstool.
 The  shall send the rod of thy strength out of Zion: rule thou in the midst of thine enemies.
 Thy people shall be willing in the day of thy power, in the beauties of holiness from the womb of the morning: thou hast the dew of thy youth.
 The  hath sworn, and will not repent, Thou art a priest for ever after the order of Melchizedek.
 The Lord at thy right hand shall strike through kings in the day of his wrath.
 He shall judge among the heathen, he shall fill the places with the dead bodies; he shall wound the heads over many countries.
 He shall drink of the brook in the way: therefore shall he lift up the head.

Verse 1
The Lord says to my lord: "Sit at my right hand until I make your enemies a footstool for your feet".Adoni may be translated as "my master" or "my lord", thus rendering verse 1 as "The Lord spoke to my master". Throughout the Hebrew Bible adoni refers to a human or angelic "master" or "lord". Since David wrote this psalm in the third person, to be sung by the Levites in the Temple in Jerusalem, from a Jewish perspective the Levites would be saying that "the Lord spoke to my master", i.e. to David.

However, the King James Version and many subsequent Christian translations capitalize the second word "Lord", implying that it refers to Jesus. Henry further claims that in this psalm, David is acknowledging Christ's sovereignty and his (David's) subservience to him. Jesus himself quoted this verse during his trial before the Sanhedrin, referring to himself, and  states that this verse was fulfilled in the ascension and exaltation of Christ.

Verse 2The Lord shall send the rod of Your strength out of Zion.
Rule in the midst of Your enemies!

Interpretation

Judaism 
The Talmud (Nedarim 32a) and Midrash Tehillim state that this psalm speaks about Abraham, who was victorious in battle to save his nephew Lot and merited priesthood. According to the Avot of Rabbi Natan (34:6) the psalm is speaking of the Jewish Messiah in the context of the Four Craftsmen in Zechariah's vision. Rashi, Gershonides, and Rabbi David Kimhi identify the subject of the psalm as David.

Christianity
As part of the messianic tradition of the Old Testament, the psalm is frequently referred to in the New Testament. Allusions are found in Mark 12:36, 14:62, Luke 20 41–44, 1 Corinthians 15:25, Hebrews 5:1–6, 6:20, 7:4–7, 7:17–24.

The Vulgate text of the psalm is part of the Latin liturgy for vespers, and there are numerous adaptations in sacral music, 
including by Georg Friedrich Händel (Dixit Dominus), Claudio Monteverdi (SV 206, SV 252–288), Johann Rosenmüller, Antonio Lotti, Antonio Vivaldi (RV 594, 595, 807), Alessandro Scarlatti, Wolfgang Amadeus Mozart (KV 193, 321, 339).

The significance of the psalm is also recognized in Protestant tradition. Nonconformist minister Matthew Henry said that this psalm is "pure gospel" and specifically refers to Jesus as the Messiah. Reformed Baptist Charles Spurgeon concurs that while David composed the psalm, the psalm is solely about Jesus.

The Priest-King

A second point on which Jewish and Christian interpretations differ is the language in verse 4, which describes a person who combines the offices of kingship and priesthood, as exemplified by the non-Jewish king Melchizedek. Ostensibly, this could not apply to King David, who was not a kohen (priest). However, Rashi explains here that the term kohen occasionally refers to a ministerial role, as in (II Sam. 8:18), "and David's sons were kohanim (ministers of state)". Gershonides and Rabbi David Kimhi further state that the term kohen could be applied to a "chief ruler". Thus, the prophetic promise, "You will be a priest forever", can be translated as "You will be a head and prince of Israel", referring to David. 

Spurgeon rejects this interpretation, stating that in ancient Israel, no one held the offices of king and priest simultaneously. However, that title can be given to Jesus, "the apostle and high priest of our profession". The psalm is used in the Epistle to the Hebrews to justify the award of the title "High Priest" to Jesus from Scripture. Henry notes: "Melchizedek was 'a priest upon his throne' (Zech. 6:13), so is Christ, king of righteousness and king of peace. Melchizedek had no successor, nor has Christ; his is an unchangeable priesthood".

Uses

Judaism
Verses 6–7 are the final two verses of Av HaRachamim, said during the Shabbat and Yom Tov morning service.

Psalm 110 is recited on Shabbat Lech-Lecha in the Siddur Avodas Yisroel.

This psalm is recited as a prayer of protection to achieve peace with enemies.

New Testament
Verse 1 is quoted in Matthew ; Mark ; Luke ; Acts ; Hebrews 1:13. Compare: ; ; ; ; ; ; ; Hebrews 1:3; 8:1; ; ; 
Verse 4 is quoted in Hebrews ;  ;

Protestantism
Oliver Cromwell reportedly had his army sing this psalm before going out to battle against Scotland; it was his "favorite fighting song". This led to Psalm 110 becoming known as "the cursing psalm".

Catholicism
In his Rule (530), Saint Benedict of Nursia designated psalms 109 to 147 for vespers, except those psalms reserved for other hours. Therefore, from the early Middle Ages, Psalm 110 (109 in the Septuagint numbering, beginning in Latin Dixit Dominus) has traditionally been recited at the beginning of vespers on every Sunday. It continues to be the first psalm at vespers on Sundays, solemnities and celebrations with the rank of "feast".

Verses 1 to 4 form the responsorial psalm that follows the first reading on the solemnity of the Holy Body and Blood of Christ in the third year of the three-year cycle of readings.

Musical settings 
 
Because this Psalm is the first in the Office of Sunday Vespers, its Latin text, which begins with Dixit Dominus, has particular significance in music. It was set by Tomás Luis de Victoria in 1581, among many other 16th century composers. Claudio Monteverdi composed a choral setting in his Vespro della Beata Vergine in 1610 and again in his Selva morale e spirituale in 1640. Marc-Antoine Charpentier composed 6 "Dixit Dominus", H.153, H.197, H.202, H.204, H.190, H.226 (1670–1690), André Campra and Alessandro Scarlatti in 1700. George Frideric Handel wrote his Dixit Dominus, HWV 232 in 1707, his earliest surviving autograph. Nicola Porpora set the psalm in 1720, and both Jan Dismas Zelenka and Antonio Vivaldi wrote three settings each. Giovanni Battista Pergolesi set the psalm in 1732, Leonardo Leo in both 1741 and 1742, and Francesco Durante in 1753. Marianna von Martines set Dixit Dominus in 1773, for her entry into the Academia Filharmonica di Bolognia. Wolfgang Amadeus Mozart set the psalm for choir and orchestra in his vespers, Vesperae solennes de Dominica,  K. 321 (1779) and Vesperae solennes de confessore, K. 339 (1780). Michel Richard Delalande and Michael Haydn composed settings in the 18th century.

Heinrich Schütz set the psalm in German twice, "Der Herr sprach zu meinem Herren", in 1619 as the first movement of his Psalmen Davids for voices and instruments (SVW 22), and for choir as part of his setting of the Becker Psalter (SWV 208). 

In 1959, Richard Rodgers composed a partial setting of the psalm for the opening sequence of his musical The Sound of Music, using verses 1, 5, and 7.

Notes

References

Sources

External links 

 
 
 Psalms Chapter 110 text in Hebrew and English, mechon-mamre.org
 Psalm 101 – Messiah, Priest, Conquering King text and detailed commentary, enduringword.com
 A psalm of David. / The LORD says to my lord:* text and footnotes, usccb.org United States Conference of Catholic Bishops
 Psalm 110:1 introduction and text, biblestudytools.com
 Psalm 110 / The Lord is king and has put on glorious apparel. Church of England
 Psalm 131 at biblegateway.com
 Hymns for Psalm 110 hymnary.org

110
Melchizedek
Works attributed to David